Cesonia is a genus of ground spiders that was first described by Eugène Simon in 1893.

Species
 it contains thirty-one species:
Cesonia aspida Chatzaki, 2002 – Greece (Crete), Turkey
Cesonia bilineata (Hentz, 1847) (type) – North America
Cesonia bixleri Platnick & Shadab, 1980 – USA
Cesonia boca Platnick & Shadab, 1980 – Panama
Cesonia bryantae Platnick & Shadab, 1980 – Jamaica
Cesonia cana Platnick & Shadab, 1980 – Jamaica
Cesonia cerralvo Platnick & Shadab, 1980 – Mexico
Cesonia chickeringi Platnick & Shadab, 1980 – Jamaica
Cesonia cincta (Banks, 1909) – Cuba
Cesonia classica Chamberlin, 1924 – California, Nevada, Arizona, Mexico
Cesonia coala Platnick & Shadab, 1980 – Mexico
Cesonia cuernavaca Platnick & Shadab, 1980 – Mexico
Cesonia desecheo Platnick & Shadab, 1980 – Puerto Rico, Virgin Is.
Cesonia ditta Platnick & Shadab, 1980 – Dominican Rep.
Cesonia elegans (Simon, 1892) – St. Vincent, Dominica
Cesonia gertschi Platnick & Shadab, 1980 – Southern Arizona, Mexico
Cesonia grisea (Banks, 1914) – Cuba
Cesonia irvingi (Mello-Leitão, 1944) – Southern tip of Florida, Bahamas, Cuba
Cesonia iviei Platnick & Shadab, 1980 – Mexico
Cesonia josephus (Chamberlin & Gertsch, 1940) – USA
Cesonia lacertosa Chickering, 1949 – Panama
Cesonia leechi Platnick & Shadab, 1980 – Mexico
Cesonia lugubris (O. Pickard-Cambridge, 1896) – Mexico, Honduras
Cesonia maculata Platnick & Shadab, 1980 – St. Kitts and Nevis
Cesonia nadleri Platnick & Shadab, 1980 – Hispaniola
Cesonia notata Chickering, 1949 – Mexico, Panama
Cesonia pudica Chickering, 1949 – Panama
Cesonia rothi Platnick & Shadab, 1980 – Southern California
Cesonia sincera Gertsch & Mulaik, 1936 – USA, Mexico
Cesonia trivittata Banks, 1898 – Southern California, Mexico
Cesonia ubicki Platnick & Shadab, 1980 – Southern Arizona, Mexico

References

Araneomorphae genera
Gnaphosidae
Spiders of North America
Taxa named by Eugène Simon